Bunche Park  is a neighborhood in Miami Gardens, Florida, United States. It was formerly a census-designated place.

Geography
Bunche Park is located at  (25.921871, -80.234469).

According to the United States Census Bureau, the CDP has a total area of 2.0 km2 (0.8 mi2), all land.

Demographics

As of the census of 2000, there were 3,972 people, 1,350 households, and 981 families residing in the CDP.  The population density was 2,017.9/km2 (5,240.0/mi2).  There were 1,432 housing units at an average density of 727.5/km2 (1,889.1/mi2).  The racial makeup of the CDP was 1.36% White, 96.45% Blacks or African American, 0.08% Native American, 0.13% Asian, 0.63% from other races, and 1.36% from two or more races. Hispanic or Latino of any race were 3.05% of the population.

In 2000 Bunche Park was the place in the United States that had the highest percentage of Bahamians, with 3.8% of the population reporting this ancestry.
   
There were 1,350 households, out of which 25.4% had children under the age of 18 living with them, 29.7% were married couples living together, 34.4% had a female householder with no husband present, and 27.3% were non-families. 24.1% of all households were made up of individuals, and 13.8% had someone living alone who was 65 years of age or older.  The average household size was 2.93 and the average family size was 3.45.

In the CDP, the population was spread out, with 28.4% under the age of 18, 7.9% from 18 to 24, 24.7% from 25 to 44, 17.7% from 45 to 64, and 21.3% who were 65 years of age or older.  The median age was 38 years. For every 100 females, there were 83.8 males.  For every 100 females age 18 and over, there were 75.9 males.

The median income for a household in the CDP was $25,898, and the median income for a family was $28,645. Males had a median income of $25,677 versus $22,259 for females. The per capita income for the CDP was $11,438.  About 22.5% of families and 27.0% of the population were below the poverty line, including 38.4% of those under age 18 and 20.2% of those age 65 or over.

As of 2000, before being annexed to Miami Gardens, English as a first language accounted for 95.97% of all residents, while Spanish was at 3.07%, and French Creole as a mother tongue made up 0.94% of the population.

As of 2000, the Bunche Park section of Miami Gardens had the ninth highest percentage of African-American and black residents in the US, with 96.5% of the populace. It was the most Bahamian place in the United States, as well as having the highest percentage of  British West Indians in the US, at 1.8% (which tied with Brentwood, Maryland.) It was also home to the fifty-third highest percentage of Haitians in the US, at 2.8% of all residents (which also tied with Sunrise, Florida; Lake Alfred, Florida; and Brentwood, New York).

Education
Miami-Dade County Public Schools operates public schools. Schools in the former CDP:
 North Dade Middle School
 Bunche Park Elementary School
 North Dade Center for Modern Language

References

Further reading
 
 The 1990 U.S. Census Bureau map of Dade County, Florida has this CDP on Page 3

External links
 City of Miami Gardens official website

Bahamian-American culture in Florida
Former census-designated places in Miami-Dade County, Florida
Neighborhoods in Miami Gardens, Florida
Former census-designated places in Florida